Aaju Peter  (born 1960, Arkisserniaq, Greenland) is an Inuk lawyer, activist and sealskin clothes designer. In 2012, she received the Order of Canada.

Aaju Peter has travelled across Greenland, Europe, and Canada, performing modern drum dance and traditional singing and displaying sealskin fashions. She graduated from Akitsiraq Law School in 2005 and was called to the bar in 2007. She has appeared in the documentary films Angry Inuk (2016) and Arctic Defenders (2013).

In 2019, Aaju Peter was a guest of the Université du Québec à Montréal and a video was produced about her visit.

In the 1980s Peter married a Canadian and moved to Frobisher Bay, now Iqaluit. She raised five children on her own and still resides in Iqaluit.

References

External links

The Frontline of Climate Change, The Walrus
2014-2018 Sedna expedition biography

1960 births
Living people
Canadian lawyers
Seal hunting
Members of the Order of Canada
Canadian Inuit women
Inuit activists
Greenlandic Inuit people
Greenlandic emigrants to Canada
Canadian women lawyers
Canadian fashion designers
Indigenous fashion designers of the Americas
Inuit from the Northwest Territories
Inuit from Nunavut
People from Iqaluit
Canadian women fashion designers